The women's points race competition at the 2020 UEC European Track Championships was held on 14 November 2020.

Results
100 laps (25 km) were raced with 10 sprints.

References

Women's points race
European Track Championships – Women's points race